Socialista refers to a former newspaper published in Czechoslovakia.

It may also refer to:
 El Socialista (newspaper), a Spanish newspaper in Madrid